[[Image:Khluimouthpiece.jpg|thumb|right|220px|Closeup of a ขลุ่ยเพียงออs blowing end, showing blowing hole, block, and duct]]

The khlui''  is a vertical duct bamboo flute from Thailand. Originated before or during the Sukhothai period (AD 1238–1583) along with many other Thai instruments. But, it was officially recorded as a Thai instrument by king Trailokkanat (1431–1488), who sets the official model of the instruments. It is a reedless instrument, generally made of bamboo, though instruments are also made from hardwood or plastic. After many generations of modifications, it survives to the present day as the khlui piang-or.

Types
The Thai Khlui keeps its beauty and look since its ancient times. With a long history, the instrument had been modified to be used in other occasions, making new types of Khlui that was invented. There are 3 main types of Khlui, although there are also many others.

The 3 types of Khlui, that is still popular to the present day.
 Khlui phiang aw (ขลุ่ยเพียงออ)
 Khlui lib (ขลุ่ยหลิบ)
 Khlui u (ขลุ่ยอู้)

Khlui piang or
Khlui phiang aw is the most popular among all types of khlui. It has a moderate range of pitch, not too high or low. It is a reed-less aerophone with 8 tone holes. At mouthpiece there is a solid wooden block ("dak'''") with a small aperture instead of a reed. The dak has the diameter of the tube and usually have the length of 2 inches, and was inserted at an end of the tube. On the side of the dak there is a square-shaped hole creates the sound of the khlui called . The khlui has 7 finger holes and a thumb hole. The khlui phiang aw is one of the oldest woodwind instruments. Its origin could be dated back to around the first century. At present, khlui usually have a very high price, because the wood is more scarced. So, plastic is used to create more conventional use. Khlui is tuned an octave higher than the middle C. The khlui phiang aw is usually tuned as a Bb khlui or a C khlui. The Bb khlui is a traditional one that is used to play Thai songs and with Thai ensemble, while the C Khlui is later modified to adapt the western chromatic scale. Both types are very common. However, traditional Thai Khlui is slightly more flat than the ideal Bb, but well-tuned khlui also exists. The khlui phiang aw is the most popular in all Thai instruments, and is widely used for recreational purposes.

Khlui lib
Khlui lib is by far the smallest Khlui in its family. It was later invented to play along with the khlui phiang aw in bands and ensembles. It is considered as the leading instrument of a Thai band, similarly to the Ranat ek and the Saw duang, because of its high pitch and its distinct sound. Khlui lib is tuned in D, Eb, or F (higher than the khlui phiang aw), with the Eb khlui as the most common among the khlui lib.

Khlui u
Khlui u is the largest of its family, as the alto version of the khlui phiang aw. Unlike the khlui phiang aw and the khlui lib, the khlui u has only 6 tone holes. It is tuned in Eb, F, or G (lower than the khlui phiang aw). It is also used in many Thai bands and ensembles.

See also
khloy
Traditional Thai musical instruments
Bamboo musical instruments

External links
Sound sample
 http://www.seasite.niu.edu/Thai/music/classical/instruments/

Bamboo flutes
Internal fipple flutes
Thai musical instruments